is a Japanese child actress represented by Nextage.

Rukawa was once a member of Charm Kids.

Filmography

TV series

Magazines

References

External links
 

Japanese child actresses
1999 births
Living people
Actresses from Tokyo